Bialy Kamien may refer to:

Paide, Estonia
Bilyi Kamin, Lviv Oblast, Ukraine
Biały Kamień, Wałbrzych, a district of the city of Wałbrzych, Poland
Biały Kamień, a glacial erratic near Połchówko, Gmina Krokowa, Puck County, Pomeranian Voivodeship, Poland